Olișcani is a village in Șoldănești District, Moldova.

Notable people
 Teofil Ioncu

References

Villages of Șoldănești District